Cameron Creek may refer to one of the following creeks:
Canada
Cameron Creek (Alberta)
Cameron Creek (Ontario)
United States
Cameron Creek, California
Cameron Creek (Washington)